Patricia Jane Berg (February 13, 1918 – September 10, 2006) was an American professional golfer. She was a founding member and the first president of the LPGA. Her 15 major title wins remains the all-time record for most major wins by a female golfer. She is a member of the World Golf Hall of Fame.

In winter times she was also a speed skater.

Amateur career
Berg was born in Minneapolis, Minnesota, and expressed an interest in football at an early age. At one point, she played quarterback on a local team that included future Oklahoma Sooners head football coach Bud Wilkinson. At the age of 13, Berg took up golf in 1931 at the suggestion of her parents; by 1934, she began her amateur career and won the Minneapolis City Championship. The following year, Berg claimed a state amateur title. She attended the University of Minnesota where she was a member of Kappa Kappa Gamma sorority. She came to national attention by reaching the final of the 1935 U.S. Women's Amateur, losing to Glenna Collett-Vare in Vare's final Amateur victory. Berg won the Titleholders in 1937. In 1938, she won the U.S. Women's Amateur at Westmoreland and the Women's Western Amateur. With a victory in the 1938 Titleholders Championship and a spot on the winning Curtis Cup team as well, Berg was selected as the Associated Press Woman Athlete of the Year, the first of three times she earned the honor. In 1939, Berg won her third consecutive Titleholders, although she was unable to compete in the U.S. Women's Amateur due to an operation on her appendix.

Professional career
After winning 29 amateur titles, she turned professional in 1940. Berg's career had been interrupted by an automobile accident in December 1941; while traveling to a fund-raising event with Helen Dettweiler, a head-on accident shattered Berg's knee.

Subsequently, she recovered and volunteered for the United States Marine Corps and was commissioned a second lieutenant in 1942.  She served in the Marine Reserves from 1942 to 1945.

Despite concerns that her golfing career would end, Berg returned to the game in 1943, helped by a locker room fall that broke adhesions which had developed in her leg. Upon her comeback, she won the Women's Western Open. She won the inaugural U.S. Women's Open in 1946. In 1948, she helped establish the forerunner of the LPGA, the Women's Professional Golf Association (WPGA), winning three tournaments that season and in 1949. When the LPGA was officially started in 1950, Berg was one of the 13 founding members and held a leadership position as the association's first president. Berg won a total of 57 events on the LPGA and WPGA circuit, and was runner-up in the 1957 Open at Winged Foot. She was runner-up in the 1956 and 1959 LPGA Championships. In addition, Berg won the 1953, 1957, and 1958 Women's Western Opens, the 1955 and 1957 Titleholders, both considered majors at the time. Her last victory came in 1962. She was voted the Associated Press Woman Athlete of the Year in 1942 and 1955, in addition to her 1938 award. During a four-year stretch from 1953 to 1956, Berg won the Vare Trophy three times for having the lowest scoring average on the LPGA. She was the LPGA Tour's top money winner twice, in 1954 and 1957, and her seven Titleholders wins is an all-time record. Berg won 15 women's major golf championships in her career, including the seven Titleholders victories, seven wins in the Women's Western Open, and the 1946 U.S. Women's Open championship.

In 1959, Berg became the first woman to hit a hole-in-one during a USGA competition, which happened at the U.S. Women's Open.

In 1963, Berg was voted the recipient of the Bob Jones Award, the highest honor given by the United States Golf Association in recognition of distinguished sportsmanship in golf. Berg received the 1986 Old Tom Morris Award from the Golf Course Superintendents Association of America, GCSAA's highest honor. The LPGA established the Patty Berg Award in 1978. In her later years, Berg teamed-up with PGA Tour player and fellow Fort Myers, Florida resident Nolan Henke to establish the Nolan Henke/Patty Berg Junior Masters to promote the development of young players.

Berg was sponsored on the LPGA Tour her entire career by public golf patriarch Joe Jemsek, owner of the famous Cog Hill Golf & Country Club in Lemont, Illinois, site of the PGA Tour's Western Open from 1991 to 2006. Berg represented another of Jemsek's public facilities, St. Andrews Golf & Country Club in West Chicago, Illinois, on the women's circuit for over 60 years.

Berg told Chicagoland Golf magazine she taught over 16,000 clinics in her lifetime – many of which were sponsored by Chicago-based Wilson Sporting Goods and were called "The Patty Berg Hit Parade." In that interview, Berg figured she personally indoctrinated to the game of golf over a half-million new players. She was a member of Wilson's Advisory Staff for 66 years, until her death.

She announced in December 2004 that she had been diagnosed with Alzheimer's disease. She died in Fort Myers from complications of the disease 21 months later at the age of 88.

Professional wins (63)

LPGA Tour wins (60)
1937 (1) Titleholders Championship (as an amateur)
1938 (1) Titleholders Championship (as an amateur)
1939 (1) Titleholders Championship (as an amateur)
1941 (3) Women's Western Open, North Carolina Open, New York Invitational
1943 (2) Women's Western Open, All American Open
1945 (1) All American Open
1946 (4) Northern California Open, Northern California Medal Tournament, Pebble Beach Open, U.S. Women's Open
1947 (3) Northern California Open, Pebble Beach Open, Northern California Medal Tournament
1948 (3) Titleholders Championship, Women's Western Open, Hardscrabble Open
1949 (3) Tampa Open, Texas PGA Championship, Hardscrabble Open
1950 (3) Eastern Open, Sunset Hills Open, Hardscrabble Women's Invitational
1951 (5) Sandhills Women's Open, Pebble Beach Weathervane, New York Weathervane, 144 Hole Weathervane, Women's Western Open
1952 (3) New Orleans Women's Open, Richmond Open, New York Weathervane
1953 (7) Jacksonville Open, Titleholders Championship, New Orleans Women's Open, Phoenix Weathervane (tied with Louise Suggs), Reno Open, All American Open, World Championship
1954 (3) Triangle Round Robin, World Championship, Ardmore Open
1955 (6) St. Petersburg Open, Titleholders Championship, Women's Western Open, All American Open, World Championship, Clock Open
1956 (2) Dallas Open, Arkansas Open
1957 (5) Havana Open, Titleholders Championship, Women's Western Open, All American Open, World Championship
1958 (2) Women's Western Open, American Women's Open
1960 (1) American Women's Open
1962 (1) Muskogee Civitan Open

LPGA majors are shown in bold.

Other wins (3)
1944 Pro-Lady Victory National (with Johnny Revolta)
1950 Orlando Two-Ball (with Earl Stewart)
1954 Orlando Two-Ball (with Pete Cooper)

Major championships

Wins (15)

Results timeline

NYF = Tournament not yet founded
NT = No tournament
DNP = Did not play
CUT = missed the half-way cut
R16, QF, SF = Round in which player lost in match play
"T" indicates a tie for a place
Green background for wins. Yellow background for top-10

Summary
Starts – 97 1
Wins – 15
2nd-place finishes – 10
3rd-place finishes – 10
Top 3 finishes – 35
Top 5 finishes – 47
Top 10 finishes – 57
Top 25 finishes – 78
Missed cuts – 12
Most consecutive cuts made – 79
Longest streak of top-10s – 32

1 Does not include those with "?"

Team appearances
Amateur
Curtis Cup (representing the United States): 1936 (tie, Cup retained), 1938 (winners)

See also

List of golfers with most LPGA Tour wins
List of golfers with most LPGA major championship wins

References

External links

Patty Berg Award

American female golfers
LPGA Tour golfers
Winners of ladies' major amateur golf championships
Winners of LPGA major golf championships
World Golf Hall of Fame inductees
Golfers from Minneapolis
University of Minnesota alumni
American female speed skaters
Marine Corps Women's Reserve personnel
United States Marine Corps officers
Deaths from dementia in Florida
Deaths from Alzheimer's disease
Sportspeople from Fort Myers, Florida
1918 births
2006 deaths
21st-century American women